The McKitterick Prize is a United Kingdom literary prize.  It is administered by the Society of Authors.  It was endowed by Tom McKitterick, who had been an editor of The Political Quarterly but had also written a novel which was never published.  The prize is awarded annually for a first novel (which need not have been published) by an author over 40.  As of 2009, the value of the prize was £4000.

The McKitterick Prize was first awarded in 1990.

List of prize winners

1990s
 1990 - Simon Mawer for Chimera
 1991 - John Loveday for Halo
 1992 - Alberto Manguel for News from a Foreign Country Came
 1993 - Andrew Barrow for The Tap Dancer
 1994 - Helen Dunmore for Zennor in Darkness
 1995 - Christopher Bigsby for Hester
 1996 - Stephen Blanchard for Gagarin and I 
 1997 - Patricia Duncker for Hallucinating Foucault
 1998 - Eli Gottlieb for The Boy Who Went Away
 1999 - Magnus Mills for The Restraint of Beasts

2000s
 2000 - Chris Dolan for Ascension Day
 2001 - Giles Waterfield for The Long Afternoon
 2002 - Manil Suri for The Death of Vishnu
 2003 - Mary Lawson for Crow Lake
 2004 - Mark Haddon for The Curious Incident of the Dog in the Night-Time
 2005 - Lloyd Jones for Mr Vogel
 2006 - Peter Pouncey for Rules for Old Men Waiting
 2007 - Reina James for This Time of Dying
 2008 - Jennie Walker for 24 for 3
 2009 - Chris Hannan for Missy

2010s
 2010 - Raphael Selbourne for Beauty
 2011 - Winner: Emma Henderson for Grace Williams Says It Loud
 (Runner-up: Frances Kay for Micka)
 2012 - Winner: Ginny Baily for Africa Junction
 (Runner-up: Cressida Connolly for My Former Heart)
 2013 - Winner: Alison Moore for The Lighthouse
 (Runner-up: Caroline Brothers for Hinterland)
 2014 - Winner: Gabriel Weston for Dirty Work
 (Runner-up: Gabriel Gbadamosi for  Vauxhall)
 2015 - Winner: Robert Allison for The Letter Bearer
 (Runner-up: Paul Ewen for Francis Pug: How To Be A Public Author)
 2016 - Winner: Petina Gappah for The Book of Memory
 (Runner-up: Nick Coleman for Pillow Man)
 2017 - Winner: David Dyer for The Midnight Watch
 (Runner-up: Austin Duffy for This Living & immortal Thing)
 2018 - Winner: Anietie Isong for Radio Sunrise
 (Runner-up: Frances Maynard for The Seven Rules of Elvira Carr)
 2019 - Winner: Kelleigh Greenberg-Jephcott for Swan Song
 (Runner-up: Carys Davies for West)

2020s 
 2020 - Winner: Claire Adam for Golden Child
 (Runner-up: Taffy Brodesser-Akner for Fleishman is in Trouble)
 2021 - Winner: Elaine Feeney for As You Were
 (Runner-up: Deepa Anappara for Djinn Patrol on the Purple Line)
 2022 - Winner: David Annand for Peterdown
 (Runner-up: Lisa Taddeo for Animal)

Sources

British fiction awards
Society of Authors awards
Awards established in 1990
1990 establishments in the United Kingdom
First book awards
Awards by age of recipient